PAE may refer to:

Science and technology
 Physical Address Extension, an x86 computer processor feature for accessing more than 4 gigabytes of RAM
 Power added efficiency, a percentage that rates the efficiency of a power amplifier
 Post Antibiotic Effect, the period of time following removal of an antibiotic drug during which there is no growth of the target organism
 Port Access Entity, in the IEEE 802.1X networking environment
 Primary amoebic encephalitis, another name for primary amoebic meningoencephalitis
 Prostatic artery embolization, a treatment for benign prostatic hypertrophy.

Places
 City of Port Adelaide Enfield, South Australia
 Paine Field (IATA airport code), an airport in Everett, Washington

Other uses
 Pacific Architects and Engineers, a United States defense contractor
 Post-autistic economics, a criticism of neoclassical economics
 Provisional Admission Exercise, an interim exercise/period in Singapore education
 Patent assertion entity, a patent troll company

See also
 Large Physical Address Extension (LPAE), in the ARM architecture